The World Guide to Covered Bridges  is published by the National Society for the Preservation of Covered Bridges (NSPCB). It uses a covered bridge numbering system developed by John Diehl, the chairman of the Ohio Covered Bridge Committee.  The committee first used the numbering system in 1953 to publish a list of covered bridges in Ohio.

The National Society for the Preservation of Covered Bridges has produced eight editions of this book.  The first edition was titled Guide to Covered Bridges of the United States.  Later editions have all been titled World Guide to Covered Bridges.

Updates to the 2021 edition are available as a PDF file.

References 

Covered bridges
1953 introductions